{{DISPLAYTITLE:C2H6ClO2PS}}
The molecular formula C2H6ClO2PS (molar mass: 160.56 g/mol, exact mass: 159.9515 u) may refer to:

 Dimethyl chlorothiophosphate
 Dimethyl phosphorochloridothioate